The Patrol of al-Abwa or Waddan occurred on the 12th of Rajab in the second Hijri year or in Safar of the same year. Muhammad took a force of 70 men and when he reached Waddan, the Quraysh were not present. However, the Banu Damrah met with Muhammad and they established a peace agreement for mutual cooperation and safety. No fighting occurred during this campaign.

Events 
After Muhammad and his followers had migrated to Medina in 622, the Muslims attacked several of the Quraysh's caravans traveling from Syria to Mecca. During the patrol to Waddan, a Muslim force sought one of the Quraysh's caravans, but was unable to engage with it. The expedition encountered a group of men from the Banu Damrah clan of the Banu Kinanah tribe in the area, and negotiations between the two camps began. A pact of friendship between the Muslims and the Banu Damrah was then produced.

According to Muslim scholar Muhammad al-Zurqani, the treaty read: "This document is from Muhammad, the Messenger of Allah, concerning the Banu Damrah in which [Muhammad] establishes for them safety and security in their wealth and lives. They can expect support from the Muslims unless they oppose the religion of Allah. They are also expected to respond positively if the Prophet seeks their help."
The treaty meant that both parties were forbidden from raiding each other, joining confederations hostile to one another, or supporting each other's enemies. William Montgomery Watt saw this as a deliberate attempt by Muhammad to provoke the Meccans.

See also
List of expeditions of Muhammad
Military career of Muhammad
Muslim–Quraysh War
Banu Quraysh

References

Campaigns led by Muhammad
Waddan
Muhammad in Medina